Winston Frank Ponder (born 1941) is a noted malacologist born and educated in New Zealand who has named and described many marine and freshwater animals, especially micromolluscs.

Education and career 
Ponder graduated with an MSc, PhD (1968) and DSc from the University of Auckland, New Zealand. He completed his Ph.D while working at the Dominion Museum but by 1969 he had taken a position at the Australian Museum, where he has remained.

Ponder was the principal research scientist in the malacology section of the Australian Museum, Sydney, Australia and helped to build up the museum's mollusc collection so that it became one of the most extensive of its kind in the world. Ponder retired from this post after a long career of more than forty years of research on molluscs, and is now an Honorary Fellow of the museum.

He has been the president of the Society of Australian Systematic Biologists, and was the managing editor of the journal Molluscan Research of the Malacological Society of Australasia. for 8 years.

Early in his career, in 1964, he worked on Antarctic collections together with Richard Dell and Alan Beu, resulting in a major monograph on the Antarctic bivalves, chitons and scaphopods.

Ponder is the author of more than 300 research publications. Many of these are on the subjects of the freshwater molluscs of Australia, and on invertebrate conservation. One major contribution was a taxonomy of the Gastropoda, which he published together with David R. Lindberg in 1997. This was the last major publication on the taxonomy of the Gastropoda that was based on the morphology of snails and slugs (their internal and external shapes and forms), and did not take into account any analysis of their DNA or RNA.

In 2008, again with David Lindberg, he edited the book "Phylogeny and Evolution of the Mollusca" in which 36 experts provided an up-to-date review on the evolutionary history of the Mollusca, based on reinvestigation of morphological characters, molecular data and the fossil record.

Honours
In 2008 Ponder received the Australian Marine Sciences Association Silver Jubilee Award for a lifetime of achievement in research on marine molluscs.

In 2009 he was awarded the Clarke Medal in recognition of his Zoological work by the Royal Society of New South Wales.

Some Gastropod taxa named by Ponder

Higher taxa 
 Subclass Eogastropoda Ponder & Lindberg, 1997
 Order Sorbeoconcha Ponder & Lindberg, 1997
 Suborder Hypsogastropoda Ponder & Lindberg, 1997

Superfamilies
 Superfamily Glacidorboidea Ponder, 1986

Families
 Eatoniellidae Ponder, 1965
 Rastodentidae  Ponder, 1966 
 Elachisinidae  Ponder, 1985 
 Emblandidae  Ponder, 1985 
 Epigridae  Ponder, 1985 
 Amathinidae  Ponder, 1987 
 Calopiidae  Ponder, 1999

Subfamilies
 Subfamily Pelycidiinae Ponder & Hall, 1983

Genera
 Microestea Ponder, 1965
 Rufodardanula Ponder, 1965
 Rastodens Ponder, 1966
 Rissolitorina Ponder, 1966
 Tridentifera Ponder, 1966
 Fictonoba Ponder, 1967
 Pseudodiala Ponder, 1967
 Pseudestea Ponder, 1967
 Pseudoskenella Ponder, 1973
 Lirobarleeia Ponder, 1983
 Kutikina Ponder & Waterhouse, 1997 
 Kessneria Walker & Ponder, 2001

Taxa named after Ponder

Genera

 Ponderia  Hoaurt, 1986 
 Ponderconcha Clark, 2009

Species in temporal order

 Aspella ponderi Radwin & D' Attilio, 1976
 Heliacus cerdaleus ponderi Garrard, 1977
 Limatula (Stabilima) ponderi Fleming, 1978 
 Echineulima ponderi Warén, 1980
 Pisinna ponderi Palazzi, 1982
 Notocrater ponderi B. A. Marshall, 1986
 Oliva (Miniaceoliva) caerulea ponderi Petuch & Sargent, 1986
 Sassia (Sassia) ponderi Beu, 1986
 Tritonoharpa ponderi Beu & Maxwell, 1987
 Favartia (Favartia) ponderi Myers & d'Attilio, 1989
 Amalda (Alcospira) ponderi Ninomiya, 1991
 Choristella ponderi McLean, 1992
 Austrotrochaclis ponderi B. A. Marshall, 1995
 Powellisetia ponderi Numanami, 1996
 Fissidentalium ponderi Lamprell & Healy, 1998
 Posticobia ponderi Clark, 2009
 Amplirhagada ponderi Köhler, 2010

Publications

 
 Clark S. A., Miller A. C. & Ponder W. F. (2003) Revision of the snail genus Austropyrgus (Gastropoda: Hydrobiidae). 109 pp.
  - There are 17 newly described species from the genus Gabbia.
 Colgan D. J., Ponder W. F., Beacham E. & Macaranas J. (2006). "Molecular phylogenetics of Caenogastropoda (Gastropoda: Mollusca)". Molecular Phylogenetics and Evolution 42(3): 717–737.  PDF
 Ponder W. & Lindberg D. R. (2008). Phylogeny and Evolution of the Mollusca. University of California Press, 469 pp. .

See also
 Taxonomy of the Gastropoda (Ponder & Lindberg, 1997)

References

External links
 photo

1944 births
New Zealand malacologists
New Zealand biologists
New Zealand marine biologists
New Zealand zoologists
Living people
University of Auckland alumni